Kravis Children's Hospital (KCH) at Mount Sinai is a nationally ranked pediatric acute care children's hospital located at the Mount Sinai campus in Manhattan, New York City, New York. The hospital has 102 pediatric beds. It is affiliated with The Icahn School of Medicine at Mount Sinai, and is a member of the Mount Sinai Health System. The hospital provides comprehensive pediatric specialties and subspecialties to infants, children, teens, and young adults aged 0–21 throughout the region.

The hospital is rated as the fourth best children's hospital in New York State (behind Cohen Children's, Morgan Stanley, and CHAM) on the 2020-21 U.S. News & World Report.

History 
Pediatrics at Mount Sinai date back to 1860 when the first ever position of chair of pediatrics in New York was created for Dr. Abraham Jacobi, known as the father of American pediatrics.

In 1988, Henry R. Kravis donated $10 million to Mount Sinai to establish a children's hospital. The hospital was named after him to honor the donation.

In November 2015 KCH officials announced the creation of an alliance with The Children's Hospital of Philadelphia to help expand their pediatric oncology program. In 2017 the alliance expanded to help KCH create a fetal medicine program at the hospital.

In December, 2019 at-the-time LSU player Joe Burrow made a visit to the hospital the day after winning the Heisman award. He spent his time at the hospital chatting with patients about adversity and perseverance, and he appeared on the hospitals' in-house TV station, Kids Zone.

In the wake of the 2020 COVID-19 pandemic Kravis Children's Hospital started to admit adult patients to help with surge capacity throughout the city. Doctors from KCH have also taken shifts at the neighboring adult hospital to help with COVID-19 ICU care. In addition, the hospital is still treating kids with COVID-19 or MIS-C.

In November 2020, Dwayne "The Rock" Johnson collaborated with Microsoft and billionaire Bill Gates to donate Xbox Series X consoles to the Kravis Children's Hospital along with 19 other children's hospitals throughout the country.

About 
As a part of their goal is to ease children going through treatment, Kravis Children's Hospital has an extensive child life department with programs ranging from a TV studio to music therapy programs. The hospital has also brought in dogs to help keep patients calm during the 2020 COVID-19 pandemic.

Awards 
On the 2019-20 rankings the hospital placed nationally in 5 specialties, #16 in diabetes and endocrinology, #28 gastroenterology and gastrointestinal surgery, #26 in nephrology, #44 in neurology and neurosurgery, and #47 in pulmonology and lung surgery.

In 2020 the hospital was awarded a Silver Award in Remodel/Renovation for the renovation of their pediatric cardiac intensive care unit by Healthcare Design Magazine.

As of the 2020-21 rankings, Kravis Children's Hospital has placed nationally in 4 out of 10 ranked pediatric specialties on U.S. News & World Report and placed 4th overall in the New York region.

Patient care units 

 16-bed pediatric intensive care unit (PICU)
 5-bed pediatric telemetry unit
 9-bed pediatric step-down/ epilepsy monitoring unit
 46-bed level IV neonatal intensive care unit (NICU)
 26-bed general pediatric beds

In popular culture 
Kravis Children's Hospital was featured in Season 1 Episode 2 of the Netflix series Diagnosis. 7-year-old Sadie Gonzalez from Queens, NY is faced with a brain disorder that causes her to have constant seizures. After preliminary treatments at Morgan Stanley Children's Hospital failed, Sadie went to neurologists at nearby Kravis Children's Hospital for treatment. She was implanted with a neurostimulator at the hospital.

In 2019, the hospital was featured in a MrBeast video titled "Giving 10,000 Presents To Kids For Christmas." The hospital was highly visible as the youtubers brought in donated presents for the children in the hospital.

See also 

 List of children's hospitals in the United States
 Mount Sinai Hospital
 Morgan Stanley Children's Hospital

References

External links 

 

Children's hospitals in the United States
Teaching hospitals in New York City
Hospitals in Manhattan
Hospitals established in 1991
Icahn School of Medicine at Mount Sinai
Children's hospitals in New York (state)